The Association Sonneurs de Veuzes was formed in Nantes in 1976 for players of the veuze, a traditional bagpipe of Brittany and Nantes.

The society promotes the knowledge of playing and the history of the instrument. 

Its founders included Roland Le Moigne, and it was later led by Thierry Moreau.

References

External links
—

Bagpipe societies
Breton music
Music organizations based in France
Arts organizations established in 1976
1976 establishments in France